In European architectural sculpture, an atlas (also known as an atlant, or atlante  or atlantid; plural atlantes)<ref name="atlex">[http://www.artlex.com/ArtLex/Aru.html Aru-Az] , Michael Delahunt, ArtLex Art Dictionary , 1996–2008.</ref> is a support sculpted in the form of a man, which may take the place of a column, a pier or a pilaster. The Roman term for such a sculptural support is telamon''' (plural telamones or telamons).

The term atlantes is the Greek plural of the name Atlas—the Titan who was forced to hold the sky on his shoulders for eternity. The alternative term, telamones, also is derived from a later mythological hero, Telamon, one of the Argonauts, who was the father of Ajax. 

The caryatid is the female precursor of this architectural form in Greece, a woman standing in the place of each column or pillar. Caryatids are found at the treasuries at Delphi and the Erechtheion on the Acropolis at Athens for Athene. They usually are in an Ionic context and represented a ritual association with the goddesses worshiped within.  The Atlante is typically life-size or larger; smaller similar figures in the decorative arts are called terms.  The body of many Atlantes turns into a rectangular pillar or other architectural feature around the waist level, a feature borrowed from the term.  The pose and expression of Atlantes very often show their effort to bear the heavy load of the building, which is rarely the case with terms and caryatids.  The herma or herm is a classical boundary marker or wayside monument to a god which is usually a square pillar with only a carved head on top, about life-size, and male genitals at the appropriate mid-point. Figures that are rightly called Atlantes may sometimes be described as herms.

Atlantes express extreme effort in their function, heads bent forward to support the weight of the structure above them across their shoulders, forearms often lifted to provide additional support, providing an architectural motif.  Atlantes and caryatids were noted by the Roman late Republican architect Vitruvius, whose description of the structures, rather than surviving examples, transmitted the idea of atlantes to the Renaissance architectural vocabulary.

Origin
Not only did the Caryatids precede them, but similar architectural figures already had been made in ancient Egypt out of monoliths. Atlantes originated in Greek Sicily and in Magna Graecia, Southern Italy. The earliest surviving atlantes are fallen ones from the Early Classical Greek temple of Zeus, the Olympeion, in Agrigento, Sicily.  Atlantes, however, have played a more significant role in Mannerist and Baroque architecture. 

During the eighteenth and nineteenth centuries, many buildings were built with glorious atlantes that look much like the Greek ones. Their selection from the two proposed designs—the other design using Caryatids—for the entrance of the Hermitage Museum that was built for Tsar Nicholas I of Russia made atlantes become even more fashionable. The portico of this building has ten enormous atlantes, approximately three times life-size, carved from Serdobol granite, which were designed by Johann Halbig and executed by the sculptor Alexander Terebenev.

Mesoamerica
Similar carved stone columns or pillars in the shape of fierce men at some sites of Pre-Columbian Mesoamerica are typically called Atlantean figures.  These figures are considered to be "massive statues of Toltec warriors".

Examples
Basilica di Santa Croce, Lecce, Italy
Casa degli Omenoni, Milan, Italy
Church of St. Georg'', Hamburg, Germany
Dům U Čtyř mamlasů, Brno, Czech Republic
Hermitage Museum, St. Petersburg, Russia
House in Kanałowa Str. 17, Poznań, Poland
Palazzo Davia Bargellini, Bologna, Italy
Pavilion Vendôme, Aix-en-Provence, France
Porta Nuova, Palermo, Italy
Sanssouci, Potsdam, Germany
Sunshine Marketplace, Victoria, Australia
Temple of Olympian Zeus, Valle dei Templi, Agrigento, Italy
Tyszkiewicz Palace, Warsaw, Poland
Zwinger Palace, Germany
Wayne County Courthouse, Wooster, Ohio, United States

Gallery

See also
Telamon

References

Bibliography

Columns and entablature
Architectural sculpture
Architectural history
Ancient Greek architecture
Ancient Roman architecture
Atlas (mythology)
Sculptures of Greek gods